Nicole Melichar-Martinez (née Melichar;) is an American tennis player who specializes in doubles.

She has won twelve doubles titles on the WTA Tour and one WTA 125 doubles title as well as two singles and seven doubles titles on the ITF Circuit. In May 2021, she peaked at No. 9 in the doubles rankings.

Melichar has won one Grand Slam title, winning the mixed-doubles crown at the 2018 Wimbledon Championships with Austrian partner Alexander Peya. She is also a two-time Grand Slam finalist in women's doubles, finishing runner-up at the 2018 Wimbledon Championships with Květa Peschke and the 2020 US Open with Xu Yifan. She has reached three WTA 1000 finals at the  Cincinnati Open in 2020 with Xu Yifan and 2022 with Ellen Perez and at the Canadian Open also in 2022 with Perez.

Melichar made her Fed Cup debut for the U.S. team in 2019, partnering Danielle Collins, losing their match against Australian pair of Ashleigh Barty and Priscilla Hon.

Personal life and background
She was born in the Czech Republic, but has lived in Florida since shortly after her birth. Her older sister Jane played tennis, and Melichar claims to have taken up the sport when she was just one year old.

Performance timelines
Only main-draw results in WTA Tour, Grand Slam tournaments, Fed Cup/Billie Jean King Cup and Olympic Games are included in win–loss records.

Doubles
Current after the 2023 Australian Open.

Mixed doubles

Significant finals

Grand Slam tournament finals

Doubles: 2 (2 runner-ups)

Mixed doubles: 1 (title)

WTA 1000 finals

Doubles: 3 (3 runner-ups)

WTA career finals

Doubles: 29 (12 titles, 17 runner-ups)

WTA Challenger finals

Doubles: 1 (title)

ITF Circuit finals

Singles: 4 (2 titles, 2 runner–ups)

Doubles: 17 (7 titles, 10 runner–ups)

World TeamTennis
Melichar has played three seasons with World TeamTennis, making her debut as a junior in 2010 with the St. Louis Aces. She has since played for the Washington Kastles in 2018 and 2019. It was announced, she will be joining the San Diego Aviators during the 2020 WTT season set to begin July 12.

She partnered with CoCo Vandeweghe in women's doubles for the San Diego Aviators during the 2020 WTT season. Both players were traded to the New York Empires more than halfway through the season. The Empires would ultimately win the 2020 WTT Championship in a Supertiebreaker over the Chicago Smash.

Notes

References

External links

 
 
 

1993 births
Living people
Sportspeople from Brno
People from Stuart, Florida
American female tennis players
Tennis people from Florida
American people of Czech descent
Wimbledon champions
Grand Slam (tennis) champions in mixed doubles
Olympic tennis players of the United States
Tennis players at the 2020 Summer Olympics